Cicero Avenue, also known as Skokie Boulevard in Skokie and Wilmette, is a major north-south street in Chicago and its suburbs in Cook and Will Counties. It carries Illinois Route 50 from its south end to Skokie, and U.S. Route 41 from Skokie to its north end. It runs north from the Governors Highway (former U.S. Route 54) in University Park, next to Governors State University, crossing major highways such as Interstate 294 (Tri-State Tollway), Interstate 55 (Stevenson Expressway), Interstate 290 (Eisenhower Expressway) and Interstate 94 (Edens Expressway), to Interstate 94 (Edens Expressway) in Wilmette.  Cicero Avenue is located 6 miles west of State Street.

Route description
Cicero Avenue begins at the Governors Highway in University Park.  About a mile further north, the road crosses into Cook County from Will County.  In Matteson, Cicero Avenue crosses U.S. Route 30 (211th Street/Lincoln Highway).  In Country Club Hills, Cicero Avenue passes under Interstate 80 and over Interstate 57, but does not have an interchange with either highway.  About a mile further north than Interstate 57, the road intersects U.S. Route 6 (159th Street) in Oak Forest.  One and one-half miles further, Cicero Avenue intersects Illinois Route 83.  The two routes run concurrent for two and one-half miles, from Midlothian to Alsip.  At their northern split in Alsip, Cicero Avenue also has an interchange with Interstate 294 (Tri-State Tollway).  In Oak Lawn the street intersects U.S. Route 12/U.S. Route 20 (95th Street).  One mile further north, at 87th Street, Cicero Avenue enters the city of Chicago.  For one mile from 63rd Street to 55th Street, Cicero Avenue serves as the eastern boundary for Chicago Midway International Airport.  Just north of Midway, the road intersects Archer Avenue.  Then, Cicero Avenue has an interchange with Interstate 55 (Stevenson Expressway).  Just north of Interstate 55, the road serves as the eastern end for the western segment of 39th Street.  Just north of here, the road enters the town of Cicero, for which it is named.  In Cicero, the road intersects Ogden Avenue, Cermak Road, and Roosevelt Road.  At Roosevelt Road, Cicero Avenue reenters Chicago.  Just north of here, the road has an interchange with Interstate 290 (Eisenhower Expressway).  North of Interstate 290, Cicero Avenue crosses Madison Street, changing from the south side to the north side.  Further north, the road intersects Chicago Avenue and Division Street.  It also intersects Illinois Route 64 (North Avenue).  The next streets that Cicero Avenue intersects are Grand Avenue, Armitage Avenue, Fullerton Avenue, Diversey Avenue, Belmont Avenue, and Addison Street.  One-half of a mile further north of Addison Street, Cicero Avenue intersects Milwaukee Avenue and Illinois Route 19 (Irving Park Road).  The road then crosses over Interstate 90 (Kennedy Expressway) and intersects Foster Avenue. Cicero Avenue has an interchange with Interstate 94 (Edens Expressway). The road then crosses U.S. Route 14 (Peterson Avenue). Cicero Avenue now leaves the city of Chicago and enters Lincolnwood, where it intersects Devon Avenue and Touhy Avenue. Cicero Avenue becomes Skokie Boulevard at Jarvis Avenue (7400 North) as it enters Skokie. At Lincoln Avenue, in Skokie, Illinois Route 50 ends, and U.S. Route 41 continues on Skokie Boulevard.  While still in Skokie, the road intersects Howard Street and the eastern end of Illinois Route 58 (Illinois Route 58 follows Dempster Street, but the road itself continues east). Skokie Boulevard finally ends at Interstate 94 (Edens Expressway) in Wilmette. U.S. Route 41 continues north onto the expressway.

Transportation
Cicero Avenue is primarily served by the 54A (North Cicero/Skokie Blvd) between Irving Park Road and Golf Road, 54 (Cicero) between Montrose Avenue and 24th Place, and 54B (South Cicero) between Cermak Road and 76th Street. The 35 (31st/35th), 47 (47th), and numerous bus routes that terminate at Midway Airport also serve the road in short segments.

Green Line at Lake Street
Blue Line at Congress Parkway
Pink Line at Cermak Road
Orange Line at 59th Street/Midway Airport

See also

References

Streets in Chicago
U.S. Route 41